United Nations Security Council Resolution 376, adopted on October 17, 1975, after examining the application of the Comoros for membership in the United Nations, the Council recommended to the General Assembly that the Comoros be admitted.

The resolution was adopted by 14 votes to none; France did not participate in the voting.

See also
 List of United Nations Security Council Resolutions 301 to 400 (1971–1976)

References
Text of the Resolution at undocs.org

External links
 

1975 in the Comoros
 0376
 0376
 0376
October 1975 events